Whiskey Dick may refer to:

Places
Whiskey Dick, Oregon, an unincorporated locale in Wasco County
Whiskey Dick Mountain, in Washington state

Other
WhiskeyDick, a Texas country-metal duo
Slang for erectile dysfunction